Jonathan James McCarthy (born January 20, 2003) is an American football quarterback for the Michigan Wolverines. He became Michigan's starting quarterback in the second week of the 2022 season.

Early years
Born on January 20, 2003, McCarthy was raised in La Grange Park, Illinois where he attended Nazareth Academy for high school. McCarthy transferred to IMG Academy in 2020 after the COVID-19 pandemic led to the cancellation of Nazareth's football season.

College career
Rated as one of the top quarterback recruits, McCarthy had offers from 33 schools including LSU, Michigan State, Ohio State, Texas, and Wisconsin. McCarthy committed to Michigan in May 2019.

2021 season
On September 4, 2021, he made his Michigan debut against Western Michigan and completed four of six passes for 80 yards, including a 69-yard touchdown pass to Daylen Baldwin. He appeared in 11 games during the 2021 season, completing 34 of 59 passes for 516 yards, five touchdowns, and two interceptions.

2022 season
Prior to the 2022 season, McCarthy competed with Cade McNamara for the role as Michigan's starting quarterback. Before the opening game, Michigan head coach Jim Harbaugh announced that the competition was close and would continue at least for the first two games, with McNamara starting in the first week against Colorado State and McCarthy starting in the second week against Hawaii. 

McCarthy started and played most of the first half against Hawaii, completing 11 of 12 passes for 229 yards and three touchdowns while leading the Wolverines to a 42–0 halftime lead. In his postgame press conference, Harbaugh announced that McCarthy would start against UConn in week 3 and added, "He's the starter moving forward on merit."

McCarthy continued as Michigan's starting quarterback, completing 15 of 18 passes against UConn for 214 yards, 18 of 26 passes against Maryland for 220 yards, and 18 of 24 passes against Iowa for 155 yards. Against Indiana on October 8, he completed 28 of 36 passes for 304 yards, two touchdowns, and one interception (on a ball tipped up into the air in the end zone). In the 2022 Fiesta Bowl, he completed 20 of 34 passes for a career-high 343 yards with two touchdowns and two interceptions. For the 2022 season, he completed 208 of 322 passes for 2,719 yards, 22 touchdowns, five interceptions, and a 155.0 quarterback rating.

College statistics

Personal life
McCarthy practices mindfulness, and notably meditates on the field before football games.

References

External links
 Michigan Wolverines profile

2003 births
Living people
American football quarterbacks
Michigan Wolverines football players
People from La Grange Park, Illinois
Players of American football from Illinois